Pori is a city in Finland.

Pori may also refer to:

 Pori (album)
 Pori (film), a 2007 Indian Tamil film starring Jiiva
 Pori, Estonia, village in Põdrala Parish, Valga County, Estonia
 Pori people, tribe from Cameroon
 University Consortium of Pori, a group of Finnish universities
 Pori, a type of puffed rice also called muri